Going to a Go-Go is a 1965 album by the Miracles, the first to credit the group as Smokey Robinson and the Miracles. It includes four of the Miracles' Top 20 hits: "Ooo Baby Baby", "The Tracks of My Tears", "Going to a Go-Go", and "My Girl Has Gone". It was produced by Miracles lead singer Smokey Robinson, along with Frank Wilson and William "Mickey" Stevenson.

Primarily produced by Miracles lead singer Smokey Robinson, Going to a Go-Go features compositions co-written by Miracles members Robinson, Ronald White, Bobby Rogers, Pete Moore, and Marv Tarplin. In fact, with the sole exception of the song, "My Baby Changes Like The Weather", this entire album was written by The Miracles.

Going to a Go-Go was the only Miracles studio LP to chart within the Top 10 of the Billboard Top LPs chart, where it remained for 40 weeks, peaking at number 8. The LP peaked at number-one on Billboard's R&B albums chart. In 2003, the album achieved Gold Record status.  It was ranked number 271 on Rolling Stone magazine's list of the 500 greatest albums of all time, and number 273 in the 2012 revised list, and number 412 in the 2020 revised list.

Going to a Go-Go was reissued on CD in 2002, coupled with the Miracles' Away We a Go-Go.

Composition
Robinson wrote or co-wrote all the tracks, apart from "My Baby Changes Like the Weather", which was written by two other Motown writers, Hal Davis and Frank Wilson. Robinson's main writing partner was his childhood friend and co-founder of the Miracles, Warren "Pete" Moore, who worked with him on seven of the album's twelve tracks. The other writers are: Miracles members Bobby Rogers, Ronald White, and Marv Tarplin, along with William "Mickey" Stevenson, a Motown songwriter and producer, who contributed to one song. Marv Tarplin, the Miracles' lead guitarist, created the evocative opening chords of "The Tracks of My Tears". and the starting guitar riffs on the title song, and "My Girl Has Gone" .

Release
Going to a Go-Go was released November 1, 1965, and reached number-eight on the Billboard Top LPs chart, and number-one on Billboard's R&B albums chart. It is the only Miracles studio LP to chart within the Top 10. (Another Miracles LP, Greatest Hits Vol. 2  was also a Top 10 success, but that was a compilation, not a studio album.)

The tracks "Ooo Baby Baby", "The Tracks of My Tears", "Going to a Go-Go", and "My Girl Has Gone", were released as singles, and reached the Top 20. "Choosey Beggar" charted on the Billboard Hot R&B Singles chart at number 35. "A Fork in the Road" was a strong regional hit in several areas of the country and was regularly performed as part of the Miracles' live show.

Going to a Go-Go was reissued on CD in 2002, coupled with the Miracles' Away We a Go-Go.

Track listing

Personnel
 Smokey Robinson – lead vocals
 Ronnie White – background vocals
Bobby Rogers – background vocals
Warren "Pete" Moore – background vocals
Claudette Robinson – background vocals
Marv Tarplin – guitarist
The Funk Brothers and the Detroit Symphony Orchestra –  instrumentation

Producers
 Smokey Robinson – producer, executive producer
 Frank Wilson – producer
 William "Mickey" Stevenson –  producer
 Pete Moore – vocal arrangements

See also
List of number-one R&B albums of 1966 (U.S.)

References

External links

Going to a Go-Go (Adobe Flash) at Spotify (streamed copy where licensed)

1965 albums
The Miracles albums
Albums produced by Smokey Robinson
Albums produced by Frank Wilson (musician)
Albums produced by William "Mickey" Stevenson
Tamla Records albums
Albums recorded at Hitsville U.S.A.